10¢ Billionaire is the sixth album released by the hard rock band BulletBoys. It was released in the summer of 2009 on Chavis Records. The album was produced by Brent Woods and written by Marq Torien. It received limited amount of promotion as the record company ceased trading.

Reception 
Writing for AllMusic, Greg Prato wrote that the album "is arguably BulletBoys heaviest release yet", and gave the album 2 and 1/2 out of 5 stars.

Track listing 
 Asteroid
 Blessed By Your Touch
 Born To Breed
 Bringing Home The Gun
 Girls Kissin' Girls
 Jenna Star
 Road To Nowhere
 Save The World
 Wasted
 Witness
 Road To Nowhere (radio remix)

Personnel 
 Marq Torien – Vocals & Guitar
 Ryche Green – Drums
 Nick Rozz – Guitars
 Rob Lane – Bass

References 

BulletBoys albums
2009 albums